Lake Creek (originally, Odd's Creek) is an unincorporated community in Delta County, Texas, United States.  The ZIP Code for Lake Creek is 75450.

The Chisum Independent School District serves area students.

See also
List of rivers of Texas

References

External links
 

Unincorporated communities in Texas
Unincorporated communities in Delta County, Texas
Dallas–Fort Worth metroplex